The Roman Catholic Diocese of Kurunegala (Lat: Dioecesis Kurunegalaensis) is a diocese of the Latin Church of the Roman Catholic Church in Sri Lanka.

Erected as the Diocese of Kurunegala in 1987, from territory in the Diocese of Chilaw, the diocese is suffragan to the Archdiocese of Colombo.

The current bishop is Harold Anthony Perera, who was appointed in 2009.

Ordinaries
Anthony Leopold Raymond Peiris (15 May 1987 Appointed - 14 May 2009 Resigned)
Harold Anthony Perera (14 May 2009 Appointed – present)

See also
Catholic Church in Sri Lanka

Kurunegala